Sulaiman Sesay-Fullah (born 16 September 1991) is a Sierra Leonean footballer who plays as a forward.

Club career
Born in Freetown, the capital of Sierra Leone, Sesay-Fullah played for Italian club Accademia Internazionale in 2006–07 season. The club was part of Inter Milan academy as an affiliated club. The two Allievi team of the club finished as the losing quarter-finalists of Lombardy regional Allievi League, and eliminated in round of 16 of Allievi Fascia B respectively. After the tournament, he was selected to Lombardy region Allievi representative team for 2007 Coppa Nazionale Primavera, a youth tournament for the representative teams of Italian regions. Lombardy did not qualify from the group stage.

Sesay-Fullah joined Internazionale's Allievi Nazionali  team in 2007–08 season, from the affiliated club, which he won the league champion. He scored 17 goals in the group stage that season, along with Luca Tremolada as the topscorer of that stage. In the next season he was promoted to Inter's senior youth team Primavera, but failed to play regularly nor scoring. He also played once for the first team in club friendlies. In 2009–10 season he left for Eupen along with Nicolas Desenclos. In January 2010 he was signed by fellow Serie A club Parma. He failed to play for both reserve and the first team due to non-EU policy.

On 26 August 2011, Sesay-Fullah joined Belgian second division club FC Brussels on loan from Parma.

International career
In September 2010, he was called to Sierra Leone national football team for a 2012 Africa Cup of Nations qualification match. He made a substitute appearance on that match, which 0–0 draw with South Africa on 10 October. He also received a call-up for national under-23 team in 2012 CAF Men's Pre-Olympic Tournament qualifying rounds.

International goal

Source: National-Football-Teams.com

References

External links
 
 

Sierra Leonean footballers
Sierra Leone international footballers
Inter Milan players
Parma Calcio 1913 players
FC Etar 1924 Veliko Tarnovo players
Challenger Pro League players
First Professional Football League (Bulgaria) players
Association football forwards
Sierra Leonean expatriate footballers
Sierra Leonean expatriate sportspeople in Belgium
Expatriate footballers in Italy
Expatriate footballers in Belgium
Expatriate footballers in Bulgaria
Sportspeople from Freetown
1991 births
Living people